Amaro Lucano is an Italian herbal liqueur in the Amaro category. It is produced by Amaro Lucano S.p.A., a family-owned company based in Pisticci, Basilicata. The adjective "Lucano" comes from Lucania, another name for Basilicata.

History
It was originally created in 1894 by Pasquale Vena, a pastry chef who blended more than 30 herbs. The secret recipe has been passed from generation to generation in the Vena family. In 1900, Amaro Lucano gained fame throughout the Kingdom of Italy, after the Vena family became the official supplier to the House of Savoy, whose coat of arms appears on the label.

After a period of recession during World War II, in 1950 the workshop became an industrial enterprise under the management of Vena's sons Leonardo and Giuseppe and in 1965 a new factory in the frazione Pisticci Scalo was opened.

In the 1970s, the Vena family also began producing other alcohol-based drinks under the name "Lucano" such as the Sambuca, Limoncello and Caffè varieties, as well as liqueur-filled chocolates.

The making of Amaro Lucano 
The process of preparing Amaro Lucano is divided in seven steps: the selection, the infusion, the processing, the secret, the control, the mixture, and the bottling.

The Selection 

The herbs needed for the mixture come from different areas of the world. They are dried naturally, crushed and mixed together. Among the herbs used, there are:.
 Artemisia absinthium
 Artemisia pontica
 Salvia sclarea (Clavy Sage)
 Musk yarrow
 Cnicus (Holy Thistle)
 bitter orange
 Gentiana
 Angelica
 Sambucus elderberry
 Ruta
 aloe
 cinnamon Essential oil

The Infusion 
The mixture is steeped in solutions of pure alcohol and water; it then goes through hot infusion process in thermo-controlled baths (55°/60 °C) overnight.

The Processing 
The mixture undergoes hot pressing to obtain an infusion.

The Secret 
Once the infusion is ready, the family secret ingredient is added to obtain the extract.

The Control 
Laboratory tests are run; the extract is aged for a period of five months. During the aging process there is stratification, which means that heavy components are on the bottom, while lighter components are on the top. The “heart” of the extract is the one kept.

The Mixture 
Pure alcohol, essential oils, water, the aged extract, sugar, caramel and water are mixed in a large tank to get a hydro-alcoholic solution.

The Bottling Line 
The mixture is then filtered, bottled and ready to be sold.

Overview
Amaro Lucano is caramel brown in color, has a bittersweet flavor, and its strength is 28% ABV. It can be savoured neat, chilled, with ice or orange zest. It is usually served as a digestif after a meal and also as a base for cocktails.

Cocktails 
Amaro Lucano is used as an apéritif and digestif, after-dinner drink, and all-day drink. It is used in cocktails such as Italian Sangria, Gelato Lucano, Amarcord.

Other products
Caffè Lucano
Sambuca Lucano
Limoncello Lucano
Vitae
Barocca
Amante
I vitigni del sud
Passione bianca

Awards
Gold medal at the San Francisco World Spirits Competition 2014
Three stars at the Superior Taste Award 2014
Silver Medal (Gold Medal for the Caffè Lucano) at the Concours Mondial de Bruxelles, Brussels

References

External links

Official website

Italian liqueurs
Products introduced in 1894
Italian brands